Statistics of Kuwaiti Premier League in the 1975–76 season.

Overview
Al Qadisiya Kuwait won the championship.

References
RSSSF

1975–76
1975–76 in Asian association football leagues
football